Fakeye is a surname. Notable people with the surname include:

Akin Fakeye (born 1936), Nigerian carver
Lukman Alade Fakeye (born 1983), Nigerian carver
Azeez Kayode Fakeye (born 1965), Nigerian carver

Surnames of Nigerian origin